The Bo Sea Pearl class are a series of four roll-on/roll-off (RoRo) ships designed for military/civilian dual use built in the People's Republic of China (PRC) for the People's Liberation Army Navy (PLAN). In peace time, these ships operates as ROPAX for civilian service, and when activated in national emergencies, these ship would act as RoRo ships for PLAN. In their civilian ROPAX role, these ships are designed to carry more than two thousand passengers. Building ships to military requirement cost more than ¥ 60 million in comparison to the less stringent civilian requirement, but this was nonetheless achieved among some opposition. These ships are also equipped with helicopter deck. Specification:
Length: 
Beam: 
Tonnage: 
Speed:

References

Auxiliary ships of the People's Liberation Army Navy